Zemacies queenslandica, common name the Queensland turrid, is a species of sea snail, a marine gastropod mollusk in the family Borsoniidae.

Description
The size of an adult shell varies between 45 mm and 60 mm.

Distribution
This marine species occurs off Southern Queensland, Australia and the Gulf of Papua .

References

 Sysoev A. & Bouchet P. (2001) New and uncommon turriform gastropods (Gastropoda: Conoidea) from the South-West Pacific. In: P. Bouchet & B.A. Marshall (eds), Tropical Deep-Sea Benthos, volume 22. Mémoires du Muséum National d'Histoire Naturelle 185: 271–320.

External links
  Bouchet P., Kantor Yu.I., Sysoev A. & Puillandre N. (2011) A new operational classification of the Conoidea. Journal of Molluscan Studies 77: 273-308 
 

queenslandica
Gastropods described in 1969